Ara Karagyan  (born on February 2, 1963), is an Armenian actor. He is known for his roles as Zorik on In the city. He was a presenter of Mougounini-Boua TV-show.

Filmography

External links 

 Ara Karagyan's biography

References

1963 births
Living people
Male actors from Yerevan
Armenian male film actors
21st-century Armenian male actors
20th-century Armenian male actors